The 2015 Pac-12 Conference men's basketball tournament was the postseason men's basketball tournament for the Pac-12 during the 2014–15 season. It was played on March 11–14, at the MGM Grand Garden Arena in Paradise, Nevada. The champion received an automatic bid to the 2015 NCAA tournament.

Seeds

Teams seeded by conference record, with ties broken by record between the tied teams followed by record against the regular-season champion, if necessary.

Schedule

Bracket

Game statistics

First round

Quarterfinals

Semifinals

Championship game

Tournament notes
 For the first time since the conference expanded to 12 teams, the #12 seed (USC) won a game.
 Arizona's 28-point win (80-52) was the largest margin of victory in the conference championship game.
 Arizona won its fifth Pac Tournament, the first university to do so. The Wildcats have the most conference tournament championships.
 Arizona was the sixth school in the past seven years to win this tournament.

All-tournament team
 Brandon Ashley, Arizona
 Rondae Hollis-Jefferson, Arizona
 Stanley Johnson, Arizona
 T. J. McConnell, Arizona
 Delon Wright, Utah
 Joe Young, Oregon

Most outstanding player
Brandon Ashley, Arizona

Hall of Honor inductees

 Fred Snowden (Arizona head coach)
 Ron Riley (Arizona State)
 Sean Lampley (California)
 Jim Davis (Colorado)
 Anthony Taylor (Oregon)
 Jim Jarvis (Oregon State)
 Casey Jacobsen (Stanford)
 Dave Meyers (UCLA)
 Alex Hannum (USC)
 Danny Vranes (Utah)
 Jon Brockman (Washington)
 Bennie Seltzer (Washington State)

References

2014–15 Pac-12 Conference men's basketball season
Pac-12 Conference men's basketball tournament
Pac-12 Conference men's basketball tournament 2015
Pac-12 Conference men's basketball tournament, 2015
College basketball tournaments in Nevada
2015 in sports in Nevada
College sports tournaments in Nevada